Time, Tequila & Therapy is the fourth studio album by American country music band Old Dominion. It was released on October 8, 2021 via Sony Music Nashville.

Content
The five members of Old Dominion (Trevor Rosen, Matthew Ramsey, Whit Sellers, Geoff Sprung, and Brad Tursi) wrote the songs for Time, Tequila & Therapy during a retreat in Asheville, North Carolina, in 2021. The five had not seen each other frequently due to the COVID-19 pandemic, and decided to get together because they had not seen each other in several months. The five of them wrote and recorded in their studio with their usual producer, Shane McAnally. The band chose "I Was on a Boat That Day" as the lead single; according to Rosen, the song was recorded from "the first couple of takes" after each of the band members had consumed a shot of tequila. In the process of recording Lonely Side of Town, the band thought that the song had a Motown influence, and offhandedly remarked that Gladys Knight should be featured on it. Through the owner of the studio, they were able to contact Knight, who agreed to appear on the song.

Critical reception
Matt Bjorke of Roughstock reviewed the album favorably, highlighting the lead single and the Gladys Knight collaboration as two of the standout tracks. He described it as a "record that demands your attention. It’s a record that entertains and it’s right up there with the best of the contemporary country music records to be released in 2021." Will Groff of Holler was less favorable, writing that the album is "so uniformly easy-breezy, that it’s hard not to feel like the band is prizing vibes over substance." He described I Wanna Live in a House with You Forever and All I Know About Girls as two of the album’s weaker tracks, writing that the latter is a "frustrating lapse into the 'hey, girl' ethos of their earlier singles."

Track listing

Charts

Weekly charts

Year-end charts

References

2021 albums
Old Dominion (band) albums
Albums produced by Shane McAnally
RCA Records albums